Kittrell-Dail House is a historic home located near Renston, Pitt County, North Carolina. It was built about 1855, and is a two-story, three-bay, side-gable, single pile frame dwelling with Greek Revival style design elements.  It has two contemporary shed roofed wings and a 20th-century rear ell.   A one-story, hip roof porch, almost the length of the house, was added about 1920–1930.  Also on the property is the contributing kitchen building (c. 1855).

It was listed on the National Register of Historic Places in 2000.

References

Houses on the National Register of Historic Places in North Carolina
Greek Revival houses in North Carolina
Houses completed in 1855
Houses in Pitt County, North Carolina
National Register of Historic Places in Pitt County, North Carolina